Berau, is a  Malayic language which is spoken by Berau Malays in Berau Regency, East Kalimantan, Indonesia. It is one three native varieties of Malay in southern Borneo along with Banjar and Kutai, of which it forms a dialect continuum.

According to the 2007 edition of Ethnologue there are 11,200 speakers of Berau.

References

Agglutinative languages
Malay dialects

Malayic languages